Andy Perry (born 28 December 1974 in Portsmouth, Hampshire, England) is a rugby union player for Newcastle Falcons in the Guinness Premiership, playing primarily as a lock.

He has previously played for Exeter and Plymouth Albion. He is a former Royal Marine and has also played for Devonport Services and Bridgwater.

Military service 
At age 17, Perry abruptly decided to join the Royal Marines, where he served for 12 years. During his time in the Royal Marines Perry was deployed to Oman, Hong Kong, the Persian Gulf, and Northern Ireland.

Rugby career 
On 21 July 2009, he signed for London Irish on a one-year deal.

References

1974 births
Living people
English rugby union players
Newcastle Falcons players
Plymouth Albion R.F.C. players
Royal Marines ranks
Rugby union locks
Rugby union players from Portsmouth